The Women's Marathon at the 1995 World Championships in Gothenburg, Sweden was held on Sunday August 5, 1995. Due to judges' error the marathon course was 400 metres short of the normal distance as at the start the women left the stadium one lap too early.

Medalists

Abbreviations
All times shown are in hours:minutes:seconds

Records

Intermediates

Final ranking

See also
 1995 Marathon Year Ranking
 Women's Olympic Marathon (1996)

References
 Results

M
Marathons at the World Athletics Championships
1995 marathons
Women's marathons
World Championships in Athletics marathon
Marathons in Sweden

nl:IAAF wereldkampioenschap marathon 1995